Winchester is the name of some places in the U.S. state of Wisconsin:

Winchester (community), Vilas County, Wisconsin, an unincorporated community in Vilas County
Winchester (CDP), Wisconsin, a census-designated place in Winnebago County
Winchester, Vilas County, Wisconsin, a town in Vilas County
Winchester, Winnebago County, Wisconsin, a town in Winnebago County